Statistics of Mongolian Premier League in the 2010 season.

Overview
Khangarid won the championship.

League standings

Group A standings

Group B standings

Play-offs

Semi-finals

Third place

Final

References
FIFA.com

Mongolia Premier League seasons
Mongolia
Mongolia
football